Arbuckle is an unincorporated community in Mason County, West Virginia, United States. Arbuckle is located along the east bank of the Kanawha River, south of Leon.

References

Unincorporated communities in Mason County, West Virginia
Unincorporated communities in West Virginia
Populated places on the Kanawha River